Hussam Kadhim Jabur Al-Shuwaili (born 17 October 1987) is an Iraqi association football player who plays as a left back for Al-Zawraa in Iraq.

Honours

Club
Al-Shorta
 2018–19 Iraqi Premier League winner
 2019 Iraqi Super Cup winner

Al-Zawraa
 2021 Iraqi Super Cup winner

Country

Iraq National football team
 2012 Arab Nations Cup Bronze medallist

Individual

 15/16 IPL Left Back of the season

References

 www.fifa.com/worldfootball/statisticsandrecords/players/player=347083/index.html
 imnsr.com
 goal.com
 

1987 births
Living people
Iraqi footballers
Iraq international footballers
Al-Bahri players
Al-Mina'a SC players
Erbil SC players
Al-Quwa Al-Jawiya players
Association football fullbacks
Al-Shorta SC players
Sportspeople from Baghdad